Solomon Wilcots (born October 9, 1964) is a former American football free safety in the National Football League (NFL), a current national television analyst and broadcaster as well as a head coach in Your Call Football. Wilcots played six seasons in the NFL for the Cincinnati Bengals, Minnesota Vikings and Pittsburgh Steelers.

Playing career
Wilcots attended Rubidoux High School in Riverside, California.

He played college football at the University of Colorado under coach Bill McCartney. He was a medical redshirt as a freshman when the Buffaloes went 1–10, but the program enjoyed a turnaround during Wilcots' time there as a defensive back with records of 7–5, 6–6, 7–4, 8–4, and three bowl appearances. He earned a degree in English literature.

In the 1987 NFL Draft, he was chosen in the eighth round (215th overall) by the Cincinnati Bengals.

During his rookie season of 1987, he played in 12 games for the Bengals and recorded the first of his two career interceptions. In 1988, he was a starter in all 16 games, and in 1989 he played in all 16 games as a reserve defensive back. In 1990, he again played in all 16 games, including 10 as a starter. In 1991, he signed with the Minnesota Vikings, playing in all 16 games, and in 1992, his final season, he played in 16 games for the Pittsburgh Steelers.

Broadcasting career
Wilcots began his television career as a weekend sports anchor for NBC Cincinnati affiliate WLWT from 1994 until 2003. During this time he spent three seasons (1998–2000) as a sideline reporter for ESPN's Sunday Night Football, for which he received an Emmy Award in 2000 for sideline reporting.

In 2001, Wilcots joined CBS, where he was a color commentator for CBS football telecasts, first paired with Ian Eagle from 2001–2008, followed by Kevin Harlan from 2009–2013, and Spero Dedes from 2014–2016. He is also an analyst on the NFL Network's NFL Total Access show. On NFL Network, Wilcots can be seen each week on "Playbook", utilizing the same "all 22" game film that coaches and players use to preview all of the upcoming games, alongside an array of former NFL players including Brian Baldinger, Sterling Sharpe and Mike Mayock. Wilcots also is the co-host of "The Red Zone" on Sirius NFL Radio with Marty Schottenheimer, Gil Brandt and Carl Banks. Wilcots announced his departure from CBS in May 2017.

For several years, Wilcots served as a television announcer for New Orleans Saints preseason games alongside Tim Brando.

Wilcots is now an analyst for Sky Sports in the UK and a guest analyst for Pro Football Focus TV.

Appearances in other media
Wilcots appears as a playable player in All-Pro Football 2K8.

References

1964 births
African-American players of American football
American football cornerbacks
American football safeties
Cincinnati Bengals players
Cleveland Browns announcers
Colorado Buffaloes football players
Living people
Minnesota Vikings players
Players of American football from Los Angeles
Pittsburgh Steelers players
National Football League announcers
American television sports announcers
College basketball announcers in the United States
Players of American football from Riverside, California
New Orleans Saints announcers
21st-century African-American people
20th-century African-American sportspeople
Sportspeople from Los Angeles
Sportspeople from Riverside, California